Numeric distribution is based on the number of outlets that carry a product (that is, outlets that list at least one of the product’s stock-keeping units, or SKUs). It is defined as the percentage of stores that stock a given brand or SKU, within the universe of stores in the relevant market. 

Distribution metrics quantify the availability of products sold through retailers, usually as a percentage of all potential outlets. Often, outlets are weighted by their share of category sales or “all commodity” sales. For marketers who sell through resellers, distribution metrics reveal a brand’s percentage of market access. Balancing a firm’s efforts in “push” (building and maintaining reseller and distribution support) and “pull” (generating customer demand) is an ongoing strategic concern for marketers.

Purpose
Numeric distribution measures a firm’s ability to convey a product to its customers in terms of total number of outlets carrying the brand. The main use of metric distribution is to understand how many physical locations stock a product or brand. This has implications for delivery systems and for the cost of servicing these outlets.

Construction
To calculate numeric distribution, marketers divide the number of stores that stock at least one SKU of a product or brand by the number of outlets in the relevant market:

Numeric Distribution (%) = 
100 x Number of Outlets Carrying Brand (#) ÷ Total Number of Outlets (#)

See also 
 All commodity volume
 Product category volume
 Category performance ratio

References

External links 
MASB Official Website

Distribution (marketing)